"S-E-X-X-Y" is a single released in 1996 by musical group They Might Be Giants, alongside their sixth album, Factory Showroom. It was the lead single from Factory Showroom.

Lyrically, the title track revolves around an attractive woman. They Might Be Giants have directly claimed that this song is simply an "ode to getting it on." The song states that "X, because it's extra, baby; Y, because it's extra, baby," to imply that the X and Y are extraneous, leaving only "S-E-X". However, it's possible to interpret the song as a depiction of a person with Klinefelter's syndrome — a person with two X chromosomes and a Y chromosome, or possibly a transgender person, as evidenced by the final lyrics of the song: "You gotta understand; she wants to be your man; she's got another plan". These theories have been denied by author John Flansburgh.

Track listing
"S-E-X-X-Y" (Radio Mix) – 3:21
"Sensurround" – 3:02
"Unforgotten" – 3:06
"We've Got a World That Swings" – 2:03
"S-E-X-X-Y" (The Warren Rigg Microwave Mix) – 7:52

Australian bonus track 
"S-E-X-X-Y" (Tee's Freeze Mix) – 5:21

Notes

References

External links
S-E-X-X-Y EP on This Might Be A Wiki
"S-E-X-X-Y" (song) on This Might Be A Wiki

1996 singles
1996 songs
Elektra Records singles
They Might Be Giants songs
Songs written by John Linnell
Songs written by John Flansburgh